Leptospermum emarginatum, commonly known as the twin-flower tea-tree or twin flower teatree, is a species of shrub that is endemic to south-eastern Australia. It has rough bark on the older stems, lance-shaped leaves with the narrower end towards the base and a small notch at the tip, white flowers in groups of up to five and hemispherical fruit that falls off when mature.

Description
It has rough bark that is shed in stringy strips on the larger branches and smooth bark on the younger stems. The flowers are borne in groups of up to five on short side shoots, each flower  in diameter.

Taxonomy and naming
Leptospermum emarginatum was first formally described in 1822 by Johann Heinrich Friedrich Link from an unpublished description by Heinrich Wendland and the description was published in Link's book Enumeratio plantarum Horti regii botanici berolinensis altera. The specific epithet (emarginatum) is from Latin meaning "notched".

Distribution and habitat
The twin-flower tea-tree grows along river banks and rocky creeks in coastal areas south from the Grose River in New South Wales to near Heyfield in Victoria.

References

emarginatum
Myrtales of Australia
Flora of New South Wales
Flora of Victoria (Australia)
Plants described in 1822